Nathan Morgan Smith (born October 18, 1994) is an American soccer player.

Career 
Smith played college soccer at the University of California, Los Angeles between 2013 and 2015. While at UCLA, Smith appeared for PSA Elite in 2014 and 2015.

He opted to forgo his senior year with the Bruins, instead signing with LA Galaxy II of the United Soccer League.

After spending two seasons with Portland Timbers 2, Smith signed with Orange County SC ahead of the 2020 season.

Smith signed with USL League One expansion side Central Valley Fuego FC on January 5, 2022.

References 

1994 births
Living people
American soccer players
Association football defenders
Homegrown Players (MLS)
LA Galaxy II players
LA Galaxy players
Major League Soccer players
Orange County SC players
Portland Timbers 2 players
Central Valley Fuego FC players
Soccer players from California
Sportspeople from Clovis, California
UCLA Bruins men's soccer players
USL Championship players
United States men's youth international soccer players